The Johnson House is a historic house in Methuen, Massachusetts.  It is a -story wood-frame house, five bays wide, with a hip roof and end chimneys.  The two bays to the right of the entrance have been replaced by a projecting bay window with Italianate paired brackets at its cornice, and the windows left of the entrance have a curved cornice from the same period.  The main entrance portico is also an Italianate addition, with jigsawn entablature and an elaborate door surround with diamond-light sidelight windows.  The house was built c. 1830 by Joseph Carleton, and was at that time probably one of the grander Federal style houses in Methuen.  By 1885 it was owned by Edward Johnson, a clerk for the Boston and Maine Railroad.

The house was listed on the National Register of Historic Places in 1984.

See also
 National Register of Historic Places listings in Methuen, Massachusetts
 National Register of Historic Places listings in Essex County, Massachusetts

References

Houses in Methuen, Massachusetts
Houses completed in 1830
National Register of Historic Places in Methuen, Massachusetts
1830 establishments in Massachusetts
Houses on the National Register of Historic Places in Essex County, Massachusetts